Mark Lewis (born 27 May 1961) is a champion New Zealand tennis player and a Professional Tennis coach. He is the younger brother of Chris Lewis and older brother of David Lewis. He spent his childhood in Auckland and was educated at St Peter's College.

Playing career
Lewis was New Zealand Men's Tennis Singles Champion 1979-80 and New Zealand Men's Tennis Doubles Champion (with B Derlin) 1980–1981 and (with P. Smith) 1983–1984. He was a member of the New Zealand Davis Cup team in 1980 and 1981. On the world tour ATP he reached a career high of 403 in singles on 22 December 1980 and a doubles high of 92 on 27 September 1984. In singles his win–loss record was 3-6 and for doubles 11-18. He won a total of $709 during his playing career. Lewis played in 3 Grand Slams: Roland Garros, US Open and Australian Open.

Coaching career
After Lewis had stopped playing he became a coach. Lewis coached Michael Stich through his win at Wimbledon over Boris Becker in 1991. After Lewis stopped coaching Stich he returned home to New Zealand and started up a junior development programme with his brother Chris. This programme developed many top juniors in Auckland, the most notable being Marina Erakovic.

Current Occupation
Lewis now lives in Auckland, New Zealand with his wife Ann-Maree, his son Tyler, and his daughter Amber. Although he does not coach anymore he is still involved with tennis and is the Club/Schools manager at Tennis Auckland.

References

1961 births
Living people
New Zealand male tennis players
People educated at St Peter's College, Auckland
Tennis players from Auckland